Dr. R. Scott Ralls is the fourth president of Wake Technical Community College. He was selected on December 6, 2007 as president of the North Carolina Community College System, serving from 2008-2015. In 2015, Dr. Ralls became president of Northern Virginia Community College. 

Ralls was born in Charlotte, North Carolina, the son of a Methodist minister. He obtained a B.S. in Industrial Relations and Psychology from the University of North Carolina at Chapel Hill and a Ph.D. in Industrial and Organizational Psychology and a Master of Arts, Industrial /Organizational Psychology, both from the University of Maryland.

Ralls served as president of Craven Community College from 2002 through 2008. Prior to becoming the president of Craven Community College, he was the vice president for Economic and Workforce Development at the NC Community College System Office, director of Economic Development at the System Office, and a director at the North Carolina Department of Commerce.

References

Wake Technical Community College website
Northern Virginia CC website
NCCCS website
NCCCS News Release
WRAL: A Brief Look at Community College President-elect Scott Ralls

Living people
North Carolina Community College System
Heads of universities and colleges in the United States
Year of birth missing (living people)